This is a list of diplomatic missions of India. India has one of the largest diplomatic networks, reflecting its links in the world and particularly in neighbouring regions: Central Asia, the Middle East, East Africa, Europe, Southeast Asia, and the rest of the Indian subcontinent. There are also far-flung missions in the Caribbean and the Pacific, locations of historical Indian diaspora communities.

As a member of the Commonwealth of Nations, Indian diplomatic missions in the capitals of other Commonwealth members are known as High Commissions. In other cities of Commonwealth countries, India calls some of its consular missions "Assistant High Commissions", although those in the cities of Birmingham and Edinburgh in the United Kingdom and the city of Hambantota in Sri Lanka are known as "Consulates-General".

As of March 2022, India has 202 missions and posts operating globally

Current missions

Africa

Americas

Asia

Europe

Oceania

International organisations

Gallery

Closed missions

Africa

Asia

Europe

Embassies to open

See also
 Foreign relations of India
 List of diplomatic missions in India
 List of ambassadors and high commissioners of India
 List of ambassadors and high commissioners to India
 Visa policy of India
 Visa requirements for Indian citizens

Notes

References

External links

Ministry of External Affairs of India
Indian embassies abroad

 
India
Diplomatic missions